Gloryhallastoopid (Or Pin the Tale on the Funky) is the eighth album by the funk ensemble Parliament. It was their penultimate album on the Casablanca Records label, and is another concept album which tries to explain that Funk was responsible for the creation of the universe (see P Funk mythology). It reuses samples from previous albums, notably the Mothership Connection and Funkentelechy vs. the Placebo Syndrome.

Track listing
"Prologue" – 0:47
"(Gloryhallastoopid) Pin the Tail on the Funky" (Collins, Clinton) – 4:06
"Party People" (Collins, Clinton, Shider) – 10:08 
"The Big Bang Theory" (Sterling, Dunbar, Clinton) – 7:10 
"The Freeze (Sizzaleenmean)" (McKnight, Clinton) – 8:59
"Colour Me Funky" (Theracon, Clinton) – 4:51
"Theme from the Black Hole" (Collins, Clinton, Theracon) – 4:38 
"May We Bang You?" (Clinton, Collins, Collins, Theracon) – 4:43

Personnel

The Odd Squad Musicians 
Totally Treacherous But Slightly Silly Axe Molestors (guitars): Michael Hampton, Garry Shider, William Collins, Phelps Collins, Gordon Carlton, DeWayne McKnight, Walter "Junie" Morrison
Underneath Below Bottom and Other Deep Basic Activities (bass): Rodney Curtis, Donnie Sterling, William Collins, DeWayne McKnight, Walter Morrison
Goofin' Gooey Quacy Quirkn' Glueon Key Bangers? (keyboards): Bernie Worrell, Walter Morrison, David Lee Chong
African Telephone Operators (drums): Dennis Chambers, Kenny Colton, Tyrone Lampkin, William Collins, DeWayne McKnight
Directory Assistance (percussion): Larry Fratangelo, Carl "Butch" Small
Pieces of Mouf (Mouf Pieces) (horns): Greg Thomas, Greg Boyer, Bennie Cowens, Larry Hatcher, Maceo Parker, Sam Peakes
Horn arrangements: Bernie Worrell, Fred Wesley, P-Funk Horns (The Baltimore Connection Horn Section), Sam Peakes

Scream Division 
The Put Yo' Boody Where Yo' Mouf Iz Choir: Ray Davis, Garry Shider, Ron Ford, Larry Heckstall, Michael "Clip" Payne, Tracey "Lewd" Lewis, Linda Shider, Dawn Silva, Sheila Horne, Jeanette Washington, Jeanette McGruder, Shirley Hayden, Janice Evans, Greg Thomas, Robert Johnson, Ron Dunbar, Jessica Cleaves, Philippe Wynne, Bootsy Collins, George Clinton, Gary Cooper, Joel Johnson, Wellington Wigout, Star Child
Additional backing vocals: Jerome Rogers, Tony Davis, Andre Williams, Larry Hackett, Walter Morrison, Rod

References

External links
 GloryHallaStoopid (Pin The Tale On The Funky) at Discogs
 Album info and lyrics at The Motherpage

Parliament (band) albums
1979 albums
Casablanca Records albums
Concept albums